Burak in Iran may refer to:
 Burak, Kermanshah
 Burak-e Olya, Kohgiluyeh and Boyer-Ahmad Province
 Burak-e Sofla, Kohgiluyeh and Boyer-Ahmad Province
 Burak, Sistan and Baluchestan